Saripalli is a village in Nellimarla mandal of Vizianagaram district in Andhra Pradesh, India.

Located on the banks of Champavathi River, Saripalli is famous for Dibbi Lingeswara Swami temple, constructed between the seventh and tenth centuries by Kalingas, featuring beautiful sculptures on the temple walls; and Ramalingeswara Swamy temple on a small hillock near adjacent to the village of Saripalli.

Gallery

References

Villages in Vizianagaram district